Phantom Planet is Missing is the debut album of the American band Phantom Planet.  It was released in 1998 on Geffen Records.

Track listing

Trivia
 "Sleep Machine" is about Alex Greenwald's television. 
 "So I Fall Again" appears on Sabrina, the Teenage Witch. This song went up to #25 on some charts.
 "Can't Take It" was written about the band itself and their struggles in the music business in general.
 "Lisa (Does It Hurt You)" features Jacques Brautbar's iconic quote: "just leave it." This quote is also the slogan of the Jacques Brautbar Fanclub (JBFC).

Personnel
Phantom Planet
Alex Greenwald – lead vocals
Sam Farrar  – bass guitar, backing vocals
Darren Robinson – lead guitar
Jacques Brautbar – rhythm guitar, backing vocals, lead vocals on "Rest Easy"
Jason Schwartzman – drums

Additional musicians
Patrick Warren - keyboards 

Production
Mark Endert, Lee Pop, Phantom Planet, Paul Fox – production
Ed Thacker; Mark Endert – mixing
John Dunne. – photographer
Mark Endert, Lee Popa, Phantom Planet, Ed Thacker. - engineering

References

Phantom Planet albums
1998 debut albums
Albums produced by Paul Fox (record producer)
Geffen Records albums